Valentin Grubeck (born 26 February 1995) is an Austrian footballer who plays for Austrian side Union Weißkirchen.

Club career
On 20 July 2021, he joined Union Weißkirchen in the fourth-tier OÖ Liga.

References

External links 
 
 Valentin Grubeck wechselt zum SV Grödig‚ laola1.at, 7 January 2016

1995 births
Living people
Austrian footballers
Austria youth international footballers
Austrian Football Bundesliga players
2. Liga (Austria) players
Austrian Regionalliga players
FK Austria Wien players
SV Grödig players
SC Austria Lustenau players
SV Horn players
FC Juniors OÖ players
LASK players
SV Ried players
SKU Amstetten players
Association football forwards
SK Schärding players